Lucy Margaret Knott ( Osborne, 7 July 1913 –  April 1987) was an English international table tennis and tennis player.

Table tennis career
Osborne won five World Table Tennis Championship medals; In the 1935 World Table Tennis Championships she won a mixed doubles bronze medal with Adrian Haydon and two years later she won another bronze with Wendy Woodhead in the women's doubles at the 1937 World Table Tennis Championships.

Two more medals were won during the 1938 World Table Tennis Championships in the singles and in the doubles with Dora Emdin. A gold medal was finally won when she was a member of the winning team in the 1947 World Table Tennis Championships. She also won eight English Open titles.

Tennis career
She played at The Championships, Wimbledon, listed as Mrs B. W. Knott, from 1949 to 1952.

Personal life and death
Osborne was born in Upton-upon-Severn, Worcestershire on 7 July 1913. She married Basil W. Knott on 25 January 1947, in Edgbaston, Birmingham. She played under the name Margaret Knott thereafter. She died in Birmingham in 1987, at the age of 73.

See also
 List of table tennis players
 List of World Table Tennis Championships medalists
 List of England players at the World Team Table Tennis Championships

References

External links
Playing stats at ITTF

1913 births
1987 deaths
British female tennis players
English female table tennis players
English female tennis players
People from Birmingham, West Midlands
Tennis people from the West Midlands (county)
World Table Tennis Championships medalists